Watchupga is a locality in Northern Victoria, Australia. The local government area of Watchupga is the Shire of Buloke. Watchupga has a grain station on the Mildura railway line with a grain silo on the site which is 84 metres tall. However, the station was closed to passenger and parcels traffic on 11 November 1975. Watchupga Post Office opened on 23 July 1900 and was closed on 29 February 1972.

References